Antônio Valentim da Costa Magalhães (1859-1903) was a Brazilian journalist, novelist and poet, and a founding member of the Brazilian Academy of Letters. He was born in Rio de Janeiro, the son of Antônio Valentim da Costa Magalhães and Maria Custódia Alves Meira. He went to study law in São Paulo, and there began his life as a writer, bohemian and journalist. A contemporary of Silva Jardim, Raimundo Correia, Raul Pompeia, Luís Murat and Luís Gama, he began to write poetry. He published his first book, Cantos e Lutas, while still in São Paulo. Returning to Rio after graduation, he entered journalism. He directed A Semana, which became an important outlet for young writers of the time. In addition to literature, this periodical endorsed abolitionism and republicanism. Simultaneously, Magalahaes continued his own writing in a variety of genres, spanning fiction, non-fiction, poetry and theatre.

The library of the Brazilian Academy of Letters began its collection with the donation, in January 1897, by Magalhães, of a copy of his novel Flor de Sangue. This is today the principal reason for the notability of the work. Magalhães himself was the first occupant of Chair 7 of the Academy, to which he was eventually succeeded by Euclides da Cunha.

References

Brazilian writers
1859 births
1903 deaths